McIlwraith or Mcilwraith is a surname. Notable people with the surname include:

Alan Mcilwraith (born 1978), Scottish fraudster
Andrew McIlwraith (1844–1932), co-founder of McIlwraith, McEacharn & Co, brother of John and Thomas McIlwraith
David McIlwraith, Canadian TV actor active since the 1970s
George McIlraith, Canadian Parliamentarian
Jean McIlwraith, (1858–1938), Canadian novelist and biographer
John McIlwraith (businessman) (1828–1902), Manufacturer, Mayor of Melbourne 1873-1874, brother of Andrew and Thomas McIlwraith
John McIlwraith (commentator), a Scottish-Canadian radio broadcaster
John McIlwraith (cricketer) (1857–1938), Australian cricket player
Sheila McIlraith, Canadian computer scientist
Thomas McIlwraith (1835–1900), three time Premier of Queensland 1879-1883, 1888, and 1893; brother of Andrew and John

Places 

 McIlwraith, Queensland, a locality in the Bundaberg Region, Queensland, Australia
 McIlwraith Range, Cape York Peninsula, Far North Queensland, Australia

Other

McIlwraith, McEacharn & Co, British-Australian shipping company